is a Japanese gunka (composition of military music)  During the late stages of the Pacific War, it was sung throughout Japan. It compares cherry blossoms with the destiny of soldiers who graduated from a military academy. Although  was thought to have written the original lyrics, he did not write the lyrics directly.

In the revised version, the story of two kamikaze pilots was established. In the song, although a pilot dies, his bond with another surviving pilot remains strong. Before their mission, kamikaze pilots would sing "Dōki no Sakura" together.

References 

1939 songs
1944 songs
Japanese-language songs
Songs about cherry blossom
Japanese patriotic songs